San Juan, officially the Municipality of San Juan, is a 2nd class municipality in the province of La Union, Philippines. According to the 2020 census, it has a population of 40,507 people.

History
Prior to the arrival of the Spanish, San Juan was an Ilocano settlement called Dalandan, which is the name of the fruit Citrus aurantium Linn. that grew abundantly in the area.

In 1582, San Juan was proclaimed a mission station under the authority of the Augustinian Order, as recorded by the Nueva Segovia Bi-centennial souvenir booklet dated April 25, 1587. By 1586 the town had become the center of the parish and was renamed San Juan by the Augustinian Fathers after the Catholic Patron Saint of San Juan Bautista. The town boasted an Augustinian convent and a population of 6,000. Its first priest was Friar Agustin Niño.

The center of the parish was subsequently transferred to Bauang, with San Juan sometimes being an out-station (visita) of Bauang and sometimes of Bacnotan. In 1707 the Church of St. John the Baptist was constructed at San Juan. In 1772, the mission station was placed under the authority of the Dominican Order. In 1807, San Juan was established as a parish in its own right.

On March 2, 1850, San Juan became part of the province of La Union, when the province was created by Governor-General Antonio Maria Blanco.

In 1898 during the latter days of the Philippine Revolution, the whole of San Juan was razed to the ground by a great fire. With the demise of the church, convent, and rectory, the church registers were destroyed, although subsequent registers from 1898 to 1917 do survive and have been microfilmed.  Municipal birth registers were begun in 1922.

After the Spanish–American War, Father Mariano Gaerlan was appointed priest. He was a native of San Juan, the first Filipino priest for the town, and one of the "Nine Clerics" of Nueva Segovia who fought in the revolution. He also began the reconstruction of the church in 1902, which was completed under his successor, Father Eustaquio Ocampo.

Another local resident, also named Mariano Gaerlan, wrote Biag ti Maysa a Lakay, Wenno Nakaam-ames a Bales (i.e., Life of an Old Man, or a Dreadful Revenge) under the pen-name of Batallador. The book was in the local Ilokano language and published in 1909. He was originally from Candon, Ilocos Sur where he also maintained a residence and an aspiring politician who was never elected to public office. He had several children including Nieves Gaerlan who married Antonio "Matias" Aquino, a then Mayor of San Juan, and "Captain" Candonino Gaerlan, a guerrilla leader, and Filipino war hero.

From 1941 to 1945 San Juan was occupied by the invading Japanese forces during World War II.

On January 19, 1942, Gaerlan co-led the first guerrilla ambush against Japanese forces in the Philippines, which was prosecuted on the southern outskirts of Candon. He was subsequently appointed commander of the Third Battalion of the 121st Infantry Regiment of the United States Armed Forces in the Philippines – Northern Luzon (USAFIP-NL). This regiment is often referred to as the La Union Infantry Regiment and was commanded by "Captain" George M. Barnett. Gaerlan was killed and subsequently beheaded later that same year at San Juan after he was betrayed by the local chief of police while visiting his sister. His head was stuffed into a jar of alcohol and displayed in the plazas of the towns en route to Candon. There the town mayor convinced the Japanese that this was in poor taste, and the container was thrown into a rice paddy west of the town.

As the war progressed, crops and local services were destroyed. Food was in short supply.

San Juan was liberated in 1945 by the soldiers of the Philippine Commonwealth Army, Philippine Constabulary, and the guerrilla units of the La Union Infantry Regiment during the Battle of San Fernando under Major Russell W. Volckmann on their way to meet the liberating forces of General Douglas MacArthur on the beaches of Lingayen Gulf.

After the war, inflation led to the financial crisis of 1950 which was followed by the introduction of import controls. Subsequent government-sponsored irrigation systems and farm technicians led to a slow but assured recovery with increased productivity and profitability.

Geography
San Juan is located in the west of the province of La Union, along the Manila North Road, between latitudes 16°39'N and 16°43'N and longitudes 120°9'E and 120°15'E.

San Juan is bounded on the north by the municipality of Bacnotan along the Baroro River, and on the east by the municipalities of San Gabriel and Bagulin along the Dasay-Duplas-Nagyubuyuban Creek. On the south it is bounded by the City of San Fernando and on the west by the South China Sea.

Some 505.08 hectares or 8.46% is claimed by the municipality of Bacnotan and San Fernando City.

Barangays
San Juan is politically subdivided into 41 barangays. These barangays are headed by elected officials: Barangay Captain, Barangay Council, whose members are called Barangay Councilors. All are elected every three years.

 Allangigan
 Aludaid
 Bacsayan
 Balballosa
 Bambanay
 Bugbugcao
 Caarusipan
 Cabaroan
 Cabugnayan
 Cacapian
 Caculangan
 Calincamasan
 Casilagan
 Catdongan
 Dangdangla
 Dasay
 Dinanum
 Duplas
 Guinguinabang
 Ili Norte (Poblacion)
 Ili Sur (Poblacion)
 Legleg
 Lubing
 Nadsaag
 Nagsabaran
 Naguirangan
 Naguituban
 Nagyubuyuban
 Oaquing
 Pacpacac
 Pagdildilan
 Panicsican
 Quidem
 San Felipe
 Santa Rosa
 Santo Rosario
 Saracat
 Sinapangan
 Taboc
 Talogtog
 Urbiztondo

Climate
The climate in San Juan is "dry" from November to April and "wet" from May to October. The south-west monsoon brings abundant rainfall during the wet season, whereas the north-east monsoon passing over the Cordillera Mountains to the east brings the drier conditions.

Demographics

According to a local 1896 census, the population of San Juan was 10,510.  At that time, there were twenty-eight barrios inhabited by 9,989 residents, and four rancherias inhabited by 521 "infieles" or non-Christians (Igorots).  These barrios were Ili, Barraca, Panicsican, Talogtog, Sabangan, Taboc, Lubing, Sinapangan, Cacapian, Caculangan, Santa Rosa, Caaniyan, Oaquing, Catdongan, Caarusipan, Guinguinabang, Bugbugcao, Pacpacac, Legleg, Nadsaag, Capacuan, Bacnotan, Dasay, Al-langigan, Bombuneg, Balballosa, Duplas and San Felipe.  The rancherias were Rancho de Locutan, Indang, Amontoc and Losoya.  Yli, also known as Poblacion, had a population of 1,134 residents described as 2 "Españoles peninsulares", 2 "Mestizos de español", 1,122 "naturales" and 8 "Chinos".

In the early 1900s cholera was a scourge that took the lives of many people.

As of the census of 2000, San Juan was home to 30,393 indigenous Ilocano people, concentrated in six barangays along the national highway. This is equivalent to 33.86% of the total population and is growing at the rate of 1.8% per annum. The average population density was 2,964 persons per square kilometer. In the two urban barangays where some 15% of the population reside, the population density rose to 3,073 persons per square kilometer, while in the remaining rural barangays the population density was 2,886 persons per square kilometer.

Economy

Tourism
San Juan is considered to be the Surfing Capital of the Northern Philippines and is known for its consistent intermediate quality surf and two surfing seasons from July to October and November to March.

There is also a local museum, Museo de San Juan.

Cottage Industries
Pottery, blanket-weaving, basketry, bamboo-craft, and broom-making are produced as a folk-industry. Hollow concrete blocks are manufactured in rural villages for local building projects.

Agriculture
Yellow corn is one of the most important crops in San Juan, and is used as a raw material for food and industrial products such as starch, corn oil, beverages, gluten, snacks etc. It constitutes about 50% of the feed for local livestock and poultry enterprises. It was nominated as the product for the One Town One Product (OTOP) Philippines program of President Gloria Macapagal Arroyo to promote entrepreneurship and create jobs.

Government
San Juan, belonging to the first congressional district of the province of La Union, is governed by a mayor designated as its local chief executive and by a municipal council as its legislative body in accordance with the Local Government Code. The mayor, vice mayor, and the councilors are elected directly by the people through an election which is being held every three years.

Elected officials

Gallery

References

External links

 [ Philippine Standard Geographic Code]
 Philippine Census Information
 Local Governance Performance Management System 

Municipalities of La Union
Beaches of the Philippines
Surfing locations in the Philippines